Ascalenia secretifera is a moth in the family Cosmopterigidae. It is found in Ethiopia.

References

Endemic fauna of Ethiopia
Moths described in 1932
Ascalenia
Insects of Ethiopia
Moths of Africa